The Ringerike Line ( or Ringeriksbana) is a proposed  extension of the Bergen Line from Jong, Sandvika to Hønefoss, Norway. In 2022, the project was postponed; the government has no commitment to any timeframe (as of Q4 2022).

Currently trains from the Bergen Line to Oslo must run via Drammen on the Randsfjord Line and the Drammen Line, or via Roa on the Roa–Hønefoss Line and the Gjøvik Line.

The project was presented as part of the original proposal of the Bergen Line when approved by Parliament in 1894, but due to the narrow gauge on the Drammen Line at the time, a temporary solution via Roa was chosen instead. Later proposals have been launched, and parliament has voted over it in 1954, 1978, 1984 and 1992; only the last being passed, but not followed up by funding, and Bane NOR has not allocated any date to start construction; detailed plans have however been produced.

Route
The line would branch off from the Asker Line just west of Sandvika Station, and continue mostly in tunnel to Hønefoss Station, with an intermediate station at Sundvollen. Current plans are to build the line as double track for a speed of 250 km/h, permitting both freight and passenger trains through 22.5 tonne axle load and maximum 1.2% gradient; electrification would be at the Norwegian standard . In 2002 a route over Åsa was preferred to a route over Kroksund by parliament; despite less passenger potential for local traffic and NOK 700 million more expensive, this would give a smaller environmental impact. Travel time for the quickest trains from Hønefoss to Oslo would be 30 minutes, compared to 60 minutes by bus or 95 minutes by current trains.

The Norwegian National Rail Administration has proposed a number of upgrades to the Bergen Line that would allow total travel time between the termini to reduce to four and a half hours. The Ringerike Line is seen as the hallmark of this attempt, that was first launched by the director of NSB in 1954; sixty years later travel time remains at six and a half hours. The project was in 2007 estimated to cost NOK 7 billion, of which NOK 4 billion would be for the line. As of 2018 the project including a parallel motorway is estimated to cost NOK 26 billion This includes a train speed raised to 250 km/h and a 23 km long railway tunnel, and a permitted road speed raised to 110 km/h.

Prior to 1989 there were four local trains in each direction from Oslo to Hønefoss; followed by one rush hour service each, but this single service has since been terminated; mainly due to quicker travel times by coaches. The Ringerike Line would allow the Oslo Commuter Rail once again to serve Ringerike; other places served usually have one hourly service, with additional services in rush hour. Reducing travel time from Hønefoss to Oslo to 30 minutes would probably cause larger population growth in Ringerike.

History

Initial proposals for the Bergens Line route went from Hønefoss via Sandvika to Oslo Vestbanestasjon (Oslo V), but the proposal met technical and political restrictions. At the time Norway had two rail gauges:  and narrow gauge . The former was taking predominance over the latter, with among others the Voss Line, the initial stage of the Bergen Line from Bergen to Voss, being converted from narrow to standard gauge. Drammenbanen, that connected Sandvika to Oslo, was narrow gauge, as was most of the rest of the western network, including the Vestfold Line; hundreds of kilometers of railway would have to be converted.

On the other side of Oslo, the North Line (now named the Gjøvik Line) was being built as standard gauge; it was considered the new mainline northwards, and was to be connected to the mainline through Gudbrandsdalen. By building a branch line from Roa to Hønefoss, the Bergens Line could be connected to Nordbanen, allowing standard gauge trackage all the way to Oslo Østbanestasjon (Oslo Ø). This also gave another advantage, as Oslo Ø was seen as superior to Oslo V; the latter only served limited commuter routes west of town while Oslo Ø was the main station for long-distance trains to Trondheim, as well as Gothenburg and Stockholm in Sweden, with whom Norway was in a union with at the time. Only by terminating at Oslo Ø would direct transfer to trains to other parts of the country be possible.

When parliament passed the building of the Bergen Line in 1894, the Roa–Hønefoss branch line was made part of the plans; but the line was given a separate name indicating that the Bergen Line would continue from Hønefoss to Oslo in a more direct route. But after the finish of the Bergen Line, other important mainline routes, in particular the Dovre Line, Sørland Line and Nordland Line, combined with the effort to convert narrow gauge line, took precedence. Ideas for the additional construction of the Ringerike Line were pressed by commercial interests in Ringerike in both 1890 and 1906, but failed both times.

In 1955 the Bergen businessperson Fritz Rieber launched an idea for the shortening of Bergensbanen; the Ulriken Tunnel through the Bergen mountains, electrification from Voss to Bergen, and the construction of the Ringerike Line. Private financing would be provided through a dedicated limited company taking a surcharge on tickets, equal to the reduction in fare induced by the shorter line; within twenty years the debt would be covered. Passed by parliament in 1955, a year later they had changed their minds and only the investments around Bergen were supported; removing the support for Ringerike. Prime Minister Trygve Bratteli commented that private debt financing would have to compete with the debt taken up by the government on other railway projects, since politicians had to see the national economy as a whole, and that private financing would not allow more lines to be built. The cost was estimated at NOK 100 million.

New proposals were debated in parliament in 1978, and again in 1984, but failing to be passed. The final decision to build the line was taken in 1992 as part of a political swap between the Labour Party and the Socialist Left Party; the Labour Party would support the line if the Socialist Left Party would support building European route E16 via the Lærdal Tunnel and Valdres, instead of via Hol or Eidfjord. Initially the agreement involved the completion of the Ringerike Line in 1997, but as of 2008 no date or funding has been set. Director of the Rail Administration, Steinar Killi, stated in 2008 that the period 2010-19 would be a natural time for completion, but only if more overall funding for railway infrastructure is provided. As either an alternative or supplement to the line, expansion of European Road E16 from Sandvika to Hønefoss has been proposed. It would involve increasing from two to four lanes on the first  from Bjørum to Hvervenmoen, estimating to cost NOK 3.5 billion; local politicians have suggested toll road financing.

The Ministry of Transport and Communications started an evaluation of the Ringerike Line, carried out by the National Rail Administration, in 2006. The first edition was completed in 2009, but was found to be insufficient, resulting in the process being restarted. A new report was published in June 2011. In September 2012, the ministry concluded that also the second report was insufficient and that it would be discarded. There were two main concerns with the report. Firstly, it was based on a single-track line which would not be built to the standards of high-speed rail. The ministry stated that all new railway plans in Norway were to have double track and be optimized for high-speed rail. Secondly, the report had a simplified economic analysis which was not sufficient to be used for political evaluation. The evaluation were based on the directives given to them and rules valid at the time, but the evaluations of the evaluations showed that the directives had to be updated. The result of the discards was that the planning of E16 was no longer tied to the planning of the railway. In 2015 the railway planning was re-tied to the northern half of the E16 road upgrade which was also delayed.

References

External links
 Jernbaneverket project page 

Railway lines in Viken
Proposed railway lines in Norway
Bergen Line